Mark Stephen Meadows 
(born September 28, 1968), known by his artist name, pighed, is an American author, entrepreneur and artist.

He is the author of over five books and inventor of patents relating to artificial intelligence, blockchain and avatars. He lectures internationally on this work as well as the intersection of art, technology and culture.

In addition to inventing software, writing books and developing artwork, Meadows is also known for his worldly adventures, specifically for hitchhiking to Baghdad in 2003, interviewing terrorists and sailing voyages. He holds a USCG captain's license and has lived aboard his sailboat since 2006.

Career

In 1993 Meadows helped design WELL.com, the world's third dot-com, and also helped develop the first open-protocol 3D multi-user environment in 1995. He worked as researcher and artist at Xerox-PARC, as Creative Director for a Stanford Research Institute venture, and as creative director and co-founder of a VR and Internet company, which he co-founded, named Construct. In 2001 he opened a gallery in Paris where he sold his paintings for two years before spending time in the Waag Society in Amsterdam, Netherlands as a researcher.

In 2010 Meadows founded Botanic Technologies, a US corporation dedicated to developing conversational avatars for use in education and video games. The company worked with a range of European, American and Asian organizations, ranging from Fortune 100 multinationals to small startups, researching and prototyping experimental products. Botanic Technologies spun off several other companies, the most notable being SEED Token, a blockchain organization which offered natural language processing and animation libraries for conversational characters.

Since 2020 Meadows has been leading teams that build avatars for social media, educational and gaming purposes. Additional independent work includes authoring books and ongoing illustrations, paintings and other art.

Books

Pause & Effect is Meadows' first book which addresses narrative, visual art and video games.

His second book, I, Avatar is a first-person travelogue of Second Life and an examination of the culture and consequences of using avatars in virtual worlds.

Tea Time With Terrorists is a travelogue of Sri Lanka and study of the Tamil militant movement. This project deviates from other work by Meadows in addressing a more physical reality.

We, Robot, published in 2010, is Meadows' fourth book addresses the emergence of robots and societal impacts.

Other publications include nearly a dozen patents, an unpublished travelogue of Iraq and a book of illustrated fables, titled 7Fables. Meadows is represented by Renee Zuckerbrot, New York, NY.

Art

Since 1987, Meadows has been selling his artwork in galleries and museums throughout the United States and Europe. He has received awards from Ars Electronica, and the Cooper-Hewitt National Design Museum, among others.

Education

Meadows completed his BA in math, philosophy and literature from St. John's College in Santa Fe, New Mexico.  He also received an MFA at The San Francisco Art Institute (painting and photography) and studied at Harvard University (biology), University of Colorado (philosophy), and Bemis Art School (painting).

Awards

Meadows has received the following awards:
 Ars Electronica, Golden Nica, Linz, Austria: 1999
Stanford Digital Art Center, Stanford CA: 1998 
NII Award Arts & Entertainment, Los Angeles CA: 1997
Cooper-Hewitt National Design Museum, New York NY: 1997
Electronic Arts Awards, SF Focus/Stoli Vodka, San Francisco CA: 1997
Thomas J. Watson Fellowship, New York NY: 1993
Art Institute Of Chicago, Chicago IL: 1986

References

External links
 Official home page markmeadows.com
 Peachpit Author Bio
 Interview with Meadows on "New Books in Digital Culture"
 Digital Health Summit Interview
 Patent: Systems and methods for an autonomous avatar driver
 Patent: Systems and methods for managing a persistent virtual avatar with migrational ability

Living people
American portrait painters
Virtual reality pioneers
Artificial intelligence researchers
Harvard University alumni
American male writers
American technology chief executives
St. John's College (Annapolis/Santa Fe) alumni
Year of birth missing (living people)